The 2011 African U-17 Championship was a football competition organized by the Confederation of African Football (CAF). The tournament took place in Rwanda. The top four teams qualified for the 2011 FIFA U-17 World Cup.

Qualification

Qualified teams

  (Host nation)

Venues

Group stage

Group A

Group B

Knock-out stage

Semifinals

Third place match

Final

Winners

Goalscorers
4 goals

 Zaniou Sana
 Stévy Epako
 Guy Bedi

3 goals

 Bertrand Traoré
 Hardy Binguila

2 goals

 Fayçal Ouedraogo
 Drissa Diarrassouba
 Yusupha Dawda Sarr
 Charles Tibingana
 Faustin Usengimana

1 goal

 Abdoul Aziz Kaboré
 Ben Issa Zerbo
 Ange Sitou
 Christ Nkounkou
 Melvan Lekandza
 Andres Koussounou Kouakou
 Jean Evrard Kouassi
 Lionel Ange Lago
 Mahmoud Abdelmonem
 Mohamed Rashad
 Malick Berthé
 Tiécoro Keita
 Justin Mico
 Ibrahima Drame
 Rémy Nassalan
 Ibrahima Ndiaye
 Mamadou Saliou Touré

External links
www.canrwanda2011.com
Confederation of African Football

 
Africa U-17 Cup of Nations
Under-17 Championship
African Under-17 Championship
International association football competitions hosted by Rwanda
2011 in youth association football